Racinoa albivertex is a moth in the Bombycidae family. It was described by Strand in 1910. It is found in Togo.

References

Natural History Museum Lepidoptera generic names catalog

Bombycidae
Moths described in 1910